The Adventurer: The Curse of the Midas Box is a 2014 fantasy adventure film directed by Jonathan Newman and starring Aneurin Barnard as the protagonist, Mariah Mundi. It also stars Michael Sheen, Sam Neill, Lena Headey, Ioan Gruffudd, Keeley Hawes, and Tristan Gemmill. It was written by Christian Taylor and Matthew Huffman, and is based on the novel Mariah Mundi by G. P. Taylor.

Plot
Mariah Mundi has no choice but to unite with the enigmatic Will Charity when his family is kidnapped by an unknown enemy. Their adventure leads them to the mysterious and majestic Prince Regent, a huge steam-powered hotel on a small island at the furthest reach of the Empire. Mariah, with the help of Sacha, must unravel the secrets of the island to find the truth behind the disappearance of his family, and prevent Otto Luger from getting his hands on the mystical and powerful Midas Box.

At the end, Will leaves to search for the boys’ parents, who are still missing. He promises to return for Mariah. A mid-credits scene reveals that their mother has been taken to Egypt by the villain Gormenberg—her husband, the boys’ father.

Cast
 Michael Sheen as Captain Will Charity - The character Captain Jack Charity (as it appears in the original G. P. Taylor novel) is reported to be partly inspired by the restaurant-owning adventurer and founder of Heroes Welcome UK, Major (Ret)  John Senior MBE TD
 Sam Neill as Otto Luger
 Lena Headey as Monica
 Mella Carron as Sacha
 Ioan Gruffudd as Charles Mundi
 Keeley Hawes as Catherine Mundi
 Aneurin Barnard as Mariah Mundi
 Tristan Gemmill as Isambard Black
 Daniel Wilde as Cleavy
 Xavier Atkins as Felix Mundi
 Vincenzo Pellegrino as Grendel
 Oliver Stark as Glocky
 Ian Reddington as Ratchit
 Ross O'Hennessy as Team Member
 Paul Lavers as Mr Dunne
 Brian Nickels as Grimm

Production 
The first in what was intended to be a film franchise, the film was produced by London- and Los Angeles-based production company Entertainment Motion Pictures.

Filming took place in sound stages and locations throughout the South West of England including St Michael's Mount, Bristol, Bath, Charlestown Harbour, Kidderminster Town railway station, and Lacock Abbey.

Reception
 
The film received lukewarm reviews, praising its cast, but critical of its plot and directing. On Rotten Tomatoes, The Adventurer: The Curse of the Midas Box has a 'rotten' score of 20%, an average rating of 5.0/10, based on 15 reviews from professional film critics. Dennis Harvey of Variety found the film, 'formulaic' and summed it up as, 'an OK time-filler for undiscriminating younger audiences, providing some hope that future developments might yield greater payoffs.' Indiewire deemed the film 'dull', citing poor writing, but praising Headey. The Hollywood Reporter praised the production values, but saw it as a 'stillborn attempt' to start a film franchise.

However, Slant Magazine found it had charming storybook qualities.

References

External links

2010s fantasy adventure films
2010s historical films
2014 films
British fantasy adventure films
Films set in the 1800s
Treasure hunt films
2010s English-language films
2010s British films